Joseph Abou Mrad (18 April 1933 – 28 October 2003) was a Lebanese footballer and manager. He played as a striker for Racing Beirut and the Lebanon national team.

Abou Mrad was awarded Lebanese Premier League top-scorer with 18 goals during the 1964–65 season. Abou Mrad played for the Lebanon national team, and scored the opening goal at the Camille Chamoun Sports City Stadium in 1957 against Romanian club Energia Ploiești. He was also the captain of the national team in 1966.

Abou Mrad was Racing Beirut's sporting director in 1971. He coached Lebanon during the 1970s, failing to qualify Lebanon to the Asian Cup during their first qualifications in 1972.

Club career 
Abou Mrad started his senior career at Intisar Chiyah, before moving to Lebanese Premier League club Racing Beirut in 1953, with whom he stayed until his retirement in 1966. Abou Mrad helped his side win two league titles, in 1955–56 and 1964–65. In the latter season, Abou Mrad was the season top-goalscorer, with 18 goals. This award was both preceded and succeeded by fellow national Levon Altonian. Abou Mrad retired from football in 1966.

International career 
Abou Mrad represented Lebanon internationally between 1953 and 1966. He played in a friendly against Hungary, on 23 January 1955, scoring one goal in a 2–3 defeat. Abou Mrad also played in another friendly against Hungary, on 29 February 1966, which ended in a 1–4 defeat. In 1957 Abou Mrad scored in the Camille Chamoun Sports City Stadium's opening game against Romanian club Energia Ploiești. Abou Mrad captained Lebanon at the 1966 Arab Cup, where Lebanon came fourth.

Managerial career 
On 18 January 1971, Abou Mrad was nominated sporting director of Racing Beirut by the club's General Assembly. He coached Lebanon from 1971 to 1973 and from 1976 to 1979, failing to qualify Lebanon to the Asian Cup during their first qualifications in 1972 and 1980.

Career statistics

International 

 Scores and results list Lebanon's goal tally first, score column indicates score after each Abou Mrad goal.

Honours

Player 
Racing Beirut
 Lebanese Premier League: 1955–56, 1964–65

Lebanon
 Pan Arab Games third place: 1957
 Arab Cup third place: 1963

Individual
 Lebanese Premier League top goalscorer: 1964–65

References

External links

 

1933 births
2003 deaths
Association football forwards
Lebanese footballers
Lebanese Premier League players
Racing Club Beirut players
Lebanon international footballers
Lebanese football managers
Lebanon national football team managers
Lebanese Premier League top scorers